Frederico S. Finan is an economist and professor at the University of California, Berkeley.

Finan is also a research associate with NBER and a research fellow at the IZA Institute of Labor Economics. In 2013, Finan was awarded a Sloan Research Fellowship.

Finan is a co-director of the Berkeley Center for Economics and Politics, and scientific director of the Initiative on Economic Development and Institutions at CEGA.

Finan has researched corruption, politics, and institutions in economic development.

References

Living people
University of California, Berkeley College of Letters and Science faculty
Brazilian economists
21st-century Brazilian economists
Year of birth missing (living people)